Earl Thomas (born August 29, 1960) is an American blues singer from California, United States. He is also a songwriter, with songs covered by artists including Tom Jones, Etta James, Solomon Burke and Screamin' Jay Hawkins. He has twice been nominated for a Grammy Award and has won the San Diego Music Award four times.

Biography and career
He was born Earl Thomas Bridgeman in Pikeville, Tennessee, United States. He went to Humboldt State University.

He started out playing the Arcata clubs in the early 1980s while still at university. He was at an open mike night at an Arcata and sang a Jackson Browne number,  "Something Fine" which was the start of his performing.

In the early 1990s, he moved to San Diego, California.  His Blue...Not Blues album was released in 1991 and received favorable reviews, and he was referred to by one reviewer as "a pleasant surprise". His self-penned song, "I Sing the Blues", was a hit for Etta James.

In 2008, he played at the Russian River Blues Festival in Sonoma County, California.

In August 2016, Thomas appeared at the Great British Rhythm and Blues Festival at Colne in Lancashire, England.

Discography
1991: Blue...Not Blues (Bizarre-Straight/Rhino)		
1994: Extra Soul (Bizarre-Planet/JDC)	
2003: Soul'd! (Memphis International)			
2005: Intersection (Memphis International)		
2005: Unplugged At Caffe Calabria (Bridgeman Enterprises)		
2006: Plantation Gospel (JP Bomann Production Company)		
2008: Earl Thomas With Paddy Milner & The Big Sounds: See It My Way (Pepper Cake/ZYX Music) 
2008: Soulshine (Conton)			
2011: Introducing The Blues Ambassadors (Earl Thomas Music)
2012: Earl Thomas & The Kings of Rhythm: Live At Biscuits & Blues (Earl Thomas Music)
2016: Crow (Earl Thomas Music)

References

American blues singers
Living people
1960 births
People from Pikeville, Tennessee